Cipto Mangunkusumo or Tjipto Mangoenkoesoemo (4 March 1886 in Pecangakan, Ambarawa, Semarang – 8 March 1943 in Batavia) was a prominent Indonesian independence leader and Sukarno's political mentor. Together with Ernest Douwes Dekker and Soewardi Soerjaningrat he was one of the three founders of the influential Indische Party, a political party disseminating the idea of self-government of the Dutch East Indies. After the party was labeled subversive by colonial court of law in 1913, he and his fellow IP leaders were exiled to the Netherlands.

Cipto advocated an Indies-based nationalism rather than Javanese nationalism. Unlike other Javanese nationalist leaders, Cipto's belief in democracy remained strong until the end of this life and in his view the traditional character of feudal Javanese civilization had to change. He considered western education and its subsequent social and cultural dislocation as indispensable in creating a revolutionary atmosphere. He disagreed with Budi Utomo's emphasis on the reinvigoration of traditional Javanese civilization. In a 1916 debate he stated: "The psyche of the Javanese people needs to be changed to such an extent that a change of language, or more cynically a killing of a language becomes urgent. Only in this way will it be possible to build another language on its ruins and also another civilization."

Cipto married his Indo (Eurasian) wife Marie Vogel in 1920.

When the three IP leaders returned to the Dutch East Indies his two companions eventually took the path of education, while Cipto remained politically active. After his exile he was involved in the Insulinde Political Party which was transformed into the new "Nationaal Indische Party" of which he became one of the leaders and its representative in the Peoples Assembly (Volksraad).

When Sukarno, future President of Indonesia, moved to Bandung, he gradually alienated from his first political mentor and father in law Tjokroaminoto (leader of the Sarekat Islam). Cipto then became his main political mentor and turned him into a convinced radical nationalist.
"In some ways this close relationship between Cipto and Sukarno was not surprising; both were highly intelligent men and extremely sensitive to the reality of the colonial situation, an injustice they took as a personal insult."

Both men were relentless and uncompromising independence fighters professing a deep concern with the plight of the poor peasant. However unlike his political pupil Cipto's often courageous actions showed a proven track record of practically improving the social predicament of peasants. As early as 1910 Cipto had devoted his unstinting services to the Javanese people during an outbreak of the plague. For his efforts he was awarded a royal decoration in the Order of Orange-Nassau, by the colonial government.

After the NIP's involvement in the farmers' strike in central Java the party was banned. Cipto co-founded the National Party of Indonesia (PNI), chaired by Sukarno. Soon thereafter he attempted to foment revolt among the Indonesians serving in the KNIL and was exiled again in 1927, this time to Banda. On Banda he was later joined by other leading revolutionaries like Hatta and Sjahrir. However, during his 11-year-long exile he was unable to further any significant political activity.

He died in 1943 and was buried in Ambarawa.

After Indonesian independence the 'Centrale Burgerlijke Ziekeninrichting Salemba' was renamed the 'Cipto Mangunkusumo Hospital'.

Legacy
Dr. Cipto Mangunkusumo Hospital is named after him, and his face appears in the 2016 series of the Rp 200 Indonesian rupiah coins.

References

Bibliography
 Glissenaar, Frans D.D.: het leven van E.F.E. Douwes Dekker (Publisher: Van Strien, Dordrecht) 
 Meijer, Hans In Indië geworteld. De 20ste eeuw. (Publisher: Bert Bakker, Amsterdam, 2004) p. 66

External links
 Article in Britannica.
 Biographical notes at the Open library.
 International institute of social history.
 JSTOR article.

1886 births
1943 deaths
20th-century Indonesian physicians
National Heroes of Indonesia
Indonesian revolutionaries
People from Semarang Regency
Members of the Volksraad (Dutch East Indies)
Sarekat Islam politicians